Ohangwena is a constituency in the Ohangwena Region of northern Namibia. It had 17,539 inhabitants in 2004 and 13,181 registered voters . It is named after the settlement of Ohangwena, today part of the town Helao Nafidi.

The constituency is sharing boundaries with Oshikango Constituency on the North, Endola Constituency on the South, Omulonga Constituency on the Eastern part and Engela on the West. The constituency office is located at Onhuno.

Politics
As is common in all constituencies of former Owamboland, Namibia's ruling SWAPO Party has dominated elections since independence. 

It won the 2015 regional election by a landslide. Its candidate Johannes Hakanyome gathered 5,778 votes, while the opposition candidates Jeremia Haufiku of the Rally for Democracy and Progress (RDP) and Lukas Mbabi of the Democratic Turnhalle Alliance (DTA), received 346 and 123 votes, respectively. Councillor Hakanyome of SWAPO was reelected in the 2020 regional election, albeit by a smaller margin. He received 3,423 votes, followed by Vilho Shimuoshili, an independent candidate, with 1,644 votes.

References 

Helao Nafidi
Constituencies of Ohangwena Region
States and territories established in 1992
1992 establishments in Namibia